Nikolai Martemjanovich Chukmaldin (1836–1901) was a Russian merchant, author, enlightener and philanthropist.

Biography
Nikolai Chukmaldin was born in the Kulakovo village near Tyumen (Tobolsk Governorate, now Tyumen Region). He was a son of the Russian Old Believer farmers Martemjan Potapovich and Melanja Egorovna.

Chukmaldin started his career as a counterman for merchants Reshetnikovs. Then he established his own business, he traded wool, tea, leather, grain. Chukmaldin tried unsuccessfully to build a weaving mill in Kulakovo and a match factory in Tyumen. In the early 1860s, he was part of a circle under the leadership of Konstantin Vysotsky (ru).

In the 1870s, Chukmaldin moved to Moscow, where he continued to engage in trade, but remembered about Tyumen.

He built a school, a stone church, a bank, a carpet factory, a baker's shop in Kulakovo. Chukmaldin helped to Tyumen cultural institutions, included the Alexander Real School and Aid Society for Students. He supported the artist Ivan Kalganov. He established a museum at the Real School by selling an Ivan Slovtsov's collection.

Chukmaldin wrote many articles for Tyumen, Tobolsk, Yekaterinburg, Saint Petersburg, Moscow printings. He travelled through Russian Empire (Crimea, North Caucasus, Transcaucasia, Grand Duchy of Finland), Germany, Austria, Switzerland, Norway, Palestine, Egypt and wrote books about his travels.

Nikolai Chukmaldin died in Berlin. He was buried in Kulakovo.

Legacy
Tyumen local historians consider Chukmaldin as an "outstanding Siberian enlightener" (выдающийся сибирский просветитель) and an "outstanding representative of  the Tyumen intelligentsia" (выдающийся представитель тюмен[ской] интеллигенции).

Since 2010, the Tyumen State University conducts the Chukmaldin's Readings (Чукмалдинские чтения), an academic conference on history and philology. In the same year an unnamed park in Tyumen was named in honor of Chukmaldin. In 2014, a monument to Chukmaldin was erected in the park.

References

Bibliography
Bespalova L. G., Bespalova Y. M. Chukmaldin Nikolai Martemjanovich // Bolshaya Tyumenskaya Entsiklopediya. Tyumen, 2004. Vol. 3, p. 401–402. (In Russian)
 Zhirov A. A. Chukmaldin Nikolai Martemjanovich // Kratkaya Entsiklopediya po Istorii Kupechestva i Kommertsii Sibiri. Novosibirsk, 1998. Vol. 4, part 2, p. 123–125. (In Russian)

External links

 Gorbacheva I. Chukmaldin Nikolai Martemjanovich (1836—1901). (In Russian)

1836 births
1901 deaths
Old Believers
People from Tyumensky Uyezd
Russian merchants
Philanthropists from the Russian Empire
19th-century writers from the Russian Empire
20th-century Russian writers
Russian enlighteners
19th-century businesspeople from the Russian Empire
19th-century philanthropists